Fredericksburg FC is an American soccer team based in Fredericksburg, Virginia, United States. Founded in 1986, the team plays in the National Premier Soccer League (NPSL), a national amateur league at the fourth tier of the United States soccer league system, in the Mid-Atlantic Division. The women's team plays in the Women's Premier Soccer League, a national amateur league at the second tier of the United States soccer league system, in the Colonial Division.

The team plays its home games at University of Mary Washington's Battleground Athletic Complex in Fredericksburg, Virginia. The team colors are black, red and white. In 2014, NPSL side RVA Football Club merged with Fredericksburg Area Soccer Association to become Fredericksburg FC.

History

RVA FC, originally from Richmond, Virginia, enjoyed great success during their first season in the NPSL at Sports Backers Stadium.  The team was coached by former American midfielder Grover Gibson, who had a successful club career in Germany. Gibson would lead RVA to a first place finish in the Mid-Atlantic Division with a balanced attacking squad, featuring 29 goals from 10 players during the regular season. The club would advance to the NPSL championship and defeat the Sonoma County Sol 2–0 at Sports Backers Stadium to claim the title and complete an undefeated 10–0–2 season.  After the 2013 season, Gibson moved the team to his hometown of Fredericksburg, VA and merged with Fredericksburg Area Soccer Association to become Fredericksburg FC.

In 2014, the team placed third in the Mid-Atlantic Conference with a 5–0–5 record but failed to qualify for the playoffs. 2015 saw the team finish first during the regular season before going out in the regional semifinal.  In 2016, the first team finished with a 6-2-2 record and a regional first round appearance.  Fredericksburg FC has qualified for the 2016 and 2017 Lamar Hunt US Open Cups.

Players

Roster

Staff

Head coach
  Grover Gibson (2013–)

Assistant coaches
  Jens Baeumer
  Don Hughes

References

National Premier Soccer League teams
Soccer clubs in Richmond, Virginia
1986 establishments in Virginia
Association football clubs established in 1986
Women's Premier Soccer League teams
Fredericksburg, Virginia